The Les Kurbas Lviv Academic Theater was founded in 1988 by Volodymyr Kuchynsky and a group of young actors who, like the outstanding Ukrainian director Les Kurbas and his colleagues in 1918, felt the need to create a theater. Oleg Mikhailovich Tsyona has been the artistic director of the theater since 2019.

Since its founding, the Les Kurbas Theater has grown into one of the most famous theater groups, both in Ukraine and abroad. Performances at the theater including:  "Garden of Unthawed Sculptures" by Lina Kostenko; "Grateful Herod" and "Narcissus" by Hryhoriy Skovoroda;  "Between Two Forces" by Volodymyr Vynnychenko; "In the Field of Blood," "Johanna, Herod's Wife," and "Apocrypha" by Lesia Ukrainka; "Dreams" and "Zabavy dlya Fausta" by Fyodor Dostoevsky; "Praise to Eros" and "Silenus Alcibiadis" by Plato; "Marco the Cursed or Oriental Legend" by Vasyl Stus; and "Waiting for Godot" by Samuel Beckett worthily represented Ukraine and won highest honors at numerous international theater festivals.

References

External links

Theatres in Lviv
Theatres completed in 1988
1988 establishments in Ukraine
Academic theatres